John Remington Mills  (1798 – 22 November 1879) was an English Liberal Party politician. He was a Member of Parliament (MP) for Wycombe from 1862 to 1868.

References

External links 
 

1798 births
1879 deaths
Liberal Party (UK) MPs for English constituencies
UK MPs 1859–1865
UK MPs 1865–1868